Mikhail Fedotovich Ovsyannikov (21 November 191511 August 1987) was a Soviet philosopher and academic who concentrated on in-depth study of Georg Wilhelm Friedrich Hegel. Ovsyannikov was head of the Philosophy Department at Moscow State University from 1968 to 1974.

Biography
Ovsyannikov was born 21 November 1915 in the settlement of Puzachi in the Imperial Russian Kursk Governorate (presently in Kursk Oblast). He completed a degree at V.I. Lenin Moscow State Pedagogical University in 1939, subsequently earning a Kandidat nauk (primary-level doctoral degree) in 1943 for a dissertation titled "The Fate of Art in the Capitalist Milieu of Hegel and Balzac" («Судьба искусства в капиталистическом обществе у Гегеля и Бальзака»). In 1961 he earned the academic title Doktor nauk (higher-level doctoral degree) for The Philosophy of Hegel, coming to be exceptionally regarded as a specialist on the critical analysis of Hegel's works.

From 1960, Ovsyannikov directed Marxist research in aesthetics at Moscow State; he chaired the philosophy department from 1960 to 1974, teaching the history of philosophy and courses on philosophical developments outside the Soviet Union. He was the general editor of Moscow State University's philosophy journal from 1969 to 1983.

Major works
 Философия Гегеля (1959)
 Гегель (1971)
 Проблемы художественного творчества (1975)
 История эстетической мысли (1983)

References

External links 
 “The Artistic Image” (1969)

1915 births
1987 deaths
People from Manturovsky District, Kursk Oblast
People from Timsky Uyezd
Soviet philosophers
Soviet historians
20th-century Russian philosophers
Russian historians of philosophy
Marxist theorists
Academic staff of Moscow State University
Recipients of the Order of Friendship of Peoples